Republican presidential nominee, Senator Barry Goldwater of Arizona chose Representative William E. Miller of New York as his vice presidential running mate. The Goldwater–Miller ticket would lose the 1964 election to the Democratic ticket of Johnson–Humphrey.

Potential running mates

Michigan Representative Gerald Ford
New York Representative William E. Miller
Pennsylvania Governor William Scranton
Connecticut former Representative & Diplomat Clare Booth Luce
Connecticut former Governor John Davis Lodge

References

Vice presidency of the United States
1964 United States presidential election
Nelson A. Rockefeller